Jazz Canada is a Canadian music television series which aired on CBC Television in 1980.

Premise
This series featured jazz concerts as produced in studio at Halifax, Toronto and Vancouver. Featured artists included

Production
Jim Guthro co-ordinated the production among the CBC regional centres involved. Episodes were taped as live performances in sparse studio settings with the intent to highlight the performances themselves. Guest artists featuring during the series included Tommy Banks Orchestra, Ed Bickert, Brian Browne, Jim Galloway Band, Sonny Greenwich, Paul Horn, Moe Koffman Quintet, Fraser MacPherson, Manteca, Rob McConnell and the Boss Brass, Big Miller, Nimmons 'n' Nine Plus Six, Doug Riley and the Don Thompson Trio.

Scheduling
This hour-long series was broadcast Fridays at 11:45 p.m. (Eastern) from 29 February to 18 April 1980. From 6 July 1980, it moved to a Sunday 4:00 p.m. time slot until its final episode was broadcast on 3 August 1980.

References

External links
 

CBC Television original programming
1980 Canadian television series debuts
1980 Canadian television series endings
1980s Canadian music television series